Homoeosoma oxycercus is a species of snout moth in the genus Homoeosoma. It was described by R. L. Goodson and Herbert H. Neunzig in 1993. It is found in North America, including California and Nevada.

References

Moths described in 1993
Phycitini